Jakub Nečas (born 26 January 1995) is a professional Czech football second striker currently playing for Zbrojovka Brno.

He made his senior league debut for Pardubice on 2 August 2014 in a Czech National Football League 1–1 home draw against Vlašim. He scored his first goals on 21 May 2016 in Vlašim's Czech National Football League 3–1 home win against Frýdek-Místek. He made his Czech First League debut for Mladá Boleslav on 19 February 2017 in a 1–1 away draw at Karviná and he scored his first top league goal in the next match – a  1–1 home draw against Teplice.

References

External links 
 
 Jakub Nečas official international statistics
 
 Jakub Nečas profile on the AC Sparta Prague official website

Czech footballers
1995 births
Living people
Association football forwards
Czech First League players
FK Mladá Boleslav players
FC Zbrojovka Brno players
Czech National Football League players
FK Pardubice players
FC Sellier & Bellot Vlašim players
Footballers from Prague
Bohemians 1905 players
FC Slovan Liberec players
Czech Republic youth international footballers
Czech Republic under-21 international footballers